Reggie is an American sitcom that aired on ABC from August 4 until September 1, 1983; it was based on the British sitcom The Fall and Rise of Reginald Perrin.

Premise
Middle-aged Reggie Potter worries about work and home life, while having sexy fantasies about his co-worker.

Cast
Richard Mulligan as Reggie Potter
Barbara Barrie as Elizabeth Potter
Timothy Busfield as Mark Potter
Dianne Kay as Linda Potter Lockett
Timothy Stack as Tom Lockett
Chip Zien as C.J. Wilcox
Jean Smart as Joan Reynolds

Episodes

References

External links
 
TV Guide

1983 American television series debuts
1983 American television series endings
1980s American sitcoms
American television series based on British television series
English-language television shows
American Broadcasting Company original programming
Television series by Sony Pictures Television